Leonard Eugene "Truck" Robinson (born October 4, 1951) is an American former professional basketball player and coach. He played in the National Basketball Association (NBA) for the Washington Bullets (1974–77), Atlanta Hawks (1977), New Orleans Jazz (1977–79), Phoenix Suns (1979–82), and New York Knicks (1982–85).

In 11 seasons Robinson played in 772 games, stayed 25,141 minutes on the court and had a .483 field goal percentage (4,816 for 9,971), .662 free throw percentage (2,355 for 3,556), 7,267 total rebounds (1,985 offensive and 5,282 defensive), 1,348 assists, 533 steals, 510 blocks, 2,253 personal fouls and 11,988 points. He ranks in the NBA's top 100 lists for career rebounds, defensive rebounds and career rebounds per game.

He was an Eastern Conference champion in 1975 with the Bullets. In the 1977-78 season he led the NBA in minutes played (3,638), defensive rebounds (990), total rebounds (1,288) and rebounds per game (15.7), in addition to being named to the All-NBA First Team and East All-Star Team the same season. He was also named to the West All-Star Team in 1981, the year he and the Suns won the Pacific Division.

Following his retirement from playing, Robinson served as an assistant coach for the Sacramento Kings from 2009 to 2012.

Biography
Known throughout the league as "Truck", Leonard Robinson used his rugged body, intelligent playmaking, and sure shot to become one of the game's best forwards in the 1970s and 1980s. Fundamentally sound in every area, he had the strength and physical attributes of a power forward along with the mobility of a small forward. He delivered a consistent cargo of offensive firepower and uncanny rebounding for 11 years in the NBA. A two-time All-Star, Robinson had his finest season with the New Orleans Jazz in 1977–78, when he averaged 22.7 points and led the NBA with 15.7 rebounds per game.

After starring at Tennessee State University, Robinson was taken by the Washington Bullets in the second round of the 1974 NBA draft. As a rookie in 1974–75, Robinson had to wait his turn behind Elvin Hayes and Mike Riordan and averaged just 5.8 points in 13.1 minutes per game. He made small contributions on a Bullets team that reached the NBA Finals that year, losing to the Golden State Warriors in four games.

Robinson's playing time doubled in his sophomore season, and his scoring and rebounding numbers improved accordingly. But it wasn't until the 1976–77 campaign, when the Bullets sent Robinson to Atlanta for Tom Henderson and a draft choice, that Robinson established himself as a star. In split duty between the Bullets and Hawks, Robinson averaged 19.0 points and 10.8 rebounds.

Prior to the 1977–78 season Robinson signed as a free agent with the New Orleans Jazz, and the Jazz sent the Hawks Ron Behagen (and cash) as compensation. In his only full season with the Jazz, Robinson turned in the finest performance of his career. At just 6-foot-7, he became one of the first non-centers ever to lead the league in rebounding, grabbing 15.7 boards per game. He also notched his career-best scoring effort (22.7 ppg), made his first All-Star appearance, and was named to the All-NBA First Team at season's end.

The Jazz, under Coach Elgin Baylor, went 39-43 but missed the playoffs for the fourth time in their four-year history.
Robinson started well in 1978–79, averaging 24.2 points and 13.4 rebounds through the first 43 games. But on January 12 the Jazz traded Robinson to the Phoenix Suns for two players and two first-round draft picks. The Suns boasted a deeper roster than the Jazz, and over the season's final 26 games Robinson averaged just 16.0 points in 29.1 minutes per game. Phoenix won 50 games that year and advanced to the Western Conference Finals before losing to Seattle in seven games.

Over his next three seasons with the Suns, Robinson averaged at least 17 points and 9 rebounds each year. Following the 1981–82 campaign he was traded to the New York Knicks for Maurice Lucas. In 1982–83 Robinson suffered through the worst slump of his career, averaging just 9.5 points and 8.1 rebounds. Fans began complaining about their "truck with four flat tires" and would often chant "Dump Truck." He played another full season for New York—with similar results—before retiring in 1984–85.

In 11 NBA seasons Robinson amassed 11,988 points and 7,267 rebounds.

NBA career statistics

Regular season 

|-
| style="text-align:left;"| 
| style="text-align:left;"|Washington
| 76 ||  || 13.1 || .486 || || .522 || 4.0 || 0.5 || 0.5 || 0.4 || 5.8
|-
| style="text-align:left;"| 
| style="text-align:left;"|Washington
| 82 ||  || 25.1 || .454 || || .672 || 6.8 || 1.4 || 0.5 || 1.3 || 11.2
|-
| style="text-align:left;"| 
| style="text-align:left;"|Washington
| 41 ||  || 32.4 || .478 || || .677 || 8.9 || 1.1 || 0.7 || 0.4 || 16.0
|-
| style="text-align:left;"| 
| style="text-align:left;"|Atlanta
| 36 ||  || 40.3 || .478 || || .772 || 12.8 || 2.7 || 1.1 || 0.6 || 22.4
|-
| style="text-align:left;"| 
| style="text-align:left;"|New Orleans
| 82 ||  ||style="background:#cfecec;"| 44.4* || .444 || || .640 ||style="background:#cfecec;"| 15.7* || 2.1 || 0.9 || 1.0 || 22.7
|-
| style="text-align:left;"| 
| style="text-align:left;"|New Orleans
| 43 ||  || 41.4 || .485 || || .723 || 13.4 || 1.7 || 0.7 || 1.5 || 24.2
|-
| style="text-align:left;"| 
| style="text-align:left;"|Phoenix
| 26 ||  || 29.1 || .508 || || .642 || 8.7 || 1.5 || 0.7 || 0.5 || 16.0
|-
| style="text-align:left;"| 
| style="text-align:left;"|Phoenix
| 82 ||  || 33.0 || .512 || || .667 || 9.4 || 1.7 || 0.7 || 0.7 || 17.3
|-
| style="text-align:left;"| 
| style="text-align:left;"|Phoenix
| 82 ||  || 37.7 || .505 || || .629 || 9.6 || 2.5 || 0.8 || 0.5 || 18.8
|-
| style="text-align:left;"| 
| style="text-align:left;"|Phoenix
| 74 || 72  || 37.1 || .513 || 1.000 || .687 || 9.7 || 2.4 || 0.6 || 0.4 || 19.1
|-
| style="text-align:left;"| 
| style="text-align:left;"|New York
| 81 || 76  || 30.0 || .462 || || .587 || 8.1 || 1.8 || 0.7 || 0.3 || 9.5
|-
| style="text-align:left;"| 
| style="text-align:left;"|New York
| 65 || 63  || 32.8 || .489 || || .646 || 8.4 || 1.4 || 0.7 || 0.4 || 10.8
|-
| style="text-align:left;"| 
| style="text-align:left;"|New York
| 2 || 1  || 17.5 || .400 || || .000 || 4.5 || 1.5 || 1.0 || 1.5 || 2.0
|- class="sortbottom"
| style="text-align:center;" colspan="2"| Career
| 772 || 212 || 32.6 || .483 || 1.000 || .662 || 9.4 || 1.7 || 0.7 || 0.7 || 15.5
|- class="sortbottom"
| style="text-align:center;" colspan="2"| All-Star
| 2 || 0 || 22.5 || .462 ||  || .500 || 5.5 || 1.5 || 0.0 || 0.0 || 6.5

Playoffs 

|-
|style="text-align:left;"|1975
|style="text-align:left;"|Washington
|17|| ||7.6||.333|| ||.500||2.4||0.4||0.4||0.6||2.1
|-
|style="text-align:left;"|1976
|style="text-align:left;"|Washington
|7|| ||19.6||.432|| ||.810||4.7||0.7||0.7||1.1||7.0
|-
|style="text-align:left;"|1979
|style="text-align:left;"|Phoenix
|15|| ||26.1||.403|| ||.652||8.1||0.7||0.4||0.8||10.5
|-
|style="text-align:left;"|1980
|style="text-align:left;"|Phoenix
|3|| ||21.3||.375|| ||.714||6.7||1.3||1.0||0.7||5.7
|-
|style="text-align:left;"|1981
|style="text-align:left;"|Phoenix
|7|| ||33.3||.351|| ||.588||10.7||1.9||0.7||0.3||10.6
|-
|style="text-align:left;"|1982
|style="text-align:left;"|Phoenix
|7|| ||30.4||.563|| ||.300||7.6||2.7||0.7||0.1||13.3
|-
|style="text-align:left;"|1983
|style="text-align:left;"|New York
|6|| ||34.2||.534|| ||.571||11.0||2.2||1.7||0.3||15.7
|-
|style="text-align:left;"|1984
|style="text-align:left;"|New York
|12|| ||30.2||.514|| ||.600||8.1||0.6||0.6||0.8||7.1
|- class="sortbottom"
| style="text-align:center;" colspan="2"| Career
| 74 || ? || 23.5 || .448 ||  || .616 || 6.8 || 1.0 || 0.6 || 0.6 || 8.2

See also
List of National Basketball Association annual minutes leaders
List of National Basketball Association annual rebounding leaders

References

External links

1951 births
Living people
African-American basketball players
American men's basketball players
Atlanta Hawks players
Basketball players from Jacksonville, Florida
National Basketball Association All-Stars
New Orleans Jazz players
New York Knicks players
Phoenix Suns players
Power forwards (basketball)
Sacramento Kings assistant coaches
Tennessee State Tigers basketball players
Washington Bullets draft picks
Washington Bullets players
21st-century African-American people
20th-century African-American sportspeople